Stan Wallis (17 November 1927 – 2 March 2013) was an Australian rules footballer who played with Footscray in the Victorian Football League (VFL).

Notes

External links 		

	
		
		
1927 births		
2013 deaths		
Australian rules footballers from Victoria (Australia)		
Western Bulldogs players
Redan Football Club players